Marko Trojak (born 28 March 1988 in Varaždin) is a Croatian retired football midfielder.

Club career 
Trojak went through the ranks of his hometown club Varteks's academy, but left the club without debuting for the first team in 2008 after a year and a half on loan to his club's feeder teams. His next club would be third-tier NK Virovitica, before experiencing first-tier football in Slovenia, having joined the ailing NK Drava Ptuj following a trial. In 2010, he moved back to Croatia, joining NK Lokomotiva, and, in April 2011, helped inflict his former club (which had changed its name from Varteks to NK Varaždin) their first loss on home turf after over a year, by assisting Nino Bule for the sole goal of the match. He went on to rejoin Varaždin that summer, participating in the club's Europa League qualifications campaign which was narrowly ended by Dinamo Bucharest with 4-3 aggregate, but would feature in only 6 league matches before the club was expelled from Croatia's top league, Prva HNL, and subsequently folded. After a season at second-tier NK Zelina, Trojak spent most of the next two and a half years two lower-tier Austrian and German clubs. In the 2015/16 winter transfer period he returned to Prva HNL football after going on trial with NK Istra 1961 and passing.

References

External links
 

1988 births
Living people
Sportspeople from Varaždin
Association football midfielders
Croatian footballers
NK Drava Ptuj players
NK Lokomotiva Zagreb players
NK Varaždin players
NK Zelina players
NK Istra 1961 players
NK Brežice 1919 players
NK Međimurje players
Second Football League (Croatia) players
Slovenian PrvaLiga players
Croatian Football League players
First Football League (Croatia) players
Austrian Regionalliga players
Slovenian Second League players
Croatian expatriate footballers
Expatriate footballers in Slovenia
Croatian expatriate sportspeople in Slovenia
Expatriate footballers in Austria
Croatian expatriate sportspeople in Austria